Johann Bodmer may refer to:

Johann Georg Bodmer (1786–1864), Swiss inventor 
Johann Jakob Bodmer (1698–1783), Swiss author and critic